Kipfenberg is a town and municipality in the district of Eichstätt in Bavaria, Germany. It is known for its hillside castle and fortress, and for being the geographical centre of Bavaria. The river Altmühl flows through the municipality and its market town of Kipfenberg.

Franz Widnmann (1846–1910), painter, graphic artist, and professor at the Royal School of Applied Arts in Munich, was born at Kipfenberg. Konrad Schumann (1942–1998), a former soldier for East Berlin hung himself in an orchard in Kipfenberg.

Communities

Mayors

References

External links

Eichstätt (district)